Goričani is a village in the municipality of Podgorica, Montenegro.

History

Ottoman Empire 
In period between 15th and 17th century there were two villages Goričani, one on the left and one on the right bank of river Morača. In 1485 the village on the left bank was recorded in the Ottoman defter as timar with 10 households. The village on the right bank belonged to Ivan Crnojević until Ottomans captured his realm too. This village on the right bank of the river was expanded through immigration and its name was gradually changed to Vukovci.

Demographics
According to the 2003 census, the village has a population of 1,205 people.

According to the 2011 census, its population was 1,462.

References

Populated places in Podgorica Municipality

fr:Goričani
sl:Goričani